William Le Pogam (born 3 March 1993) is a French professional footballer who plays as a left-back for Swiss Challenge League club Yverdon. Besides France, he has played in Spain and Switzerland.

Career
On 21 August 2019, Le Pogam joined Swiss Challenge League club FC Stade Lausanne Ouchy on a contract until 30 June 2020.

Le Pogam signed with Yverdon in 2020.

References

External links
Profile at Swiss Super League

1993 births
Living people
French footballers
French expatriate footballers
Rayo Vallecano B players
CD Toledo players
Servette FC players
Neuchâtel Xamax FCS players
Yverdon-Sport FC players
Championnat National 2 players
Championnat National 3 players
Segunda División B players
Swiss Challenge League players
Swiss Super League players
Association football defenders
French expatriate sportspeople in Spain
French expatriate sportspeople in Switzerland
Expatriate footballers in Spain
Expatriate footballers in Switzerland